Christopher L.-H. Huang FRSB is professor of cell physiology at the University of Cambridge.

Christopher L.-H. Huang was awarded a Florence Heale Scholar to read Medicine and Physiology at The Queen's College, Oxford. He completed his preregistration clinical appointments in the Nuffield Department of Medicine, The John Radcliffe Hospital, Oxford. He then joined Gonville and Caius College, Cambridge  as an MRC Scholar to complete a PhD in membrane biophysics, and then successively became an Assistant Lecturer and Lecturer in Physiology, Reader and finally the Professor of Cell Physiology at Cambridge, whilst being Fellow and Director of Medical Studies at Murray Edwards College. He is also independent nonexecutive director of Hutchison China Meditech and Hutchison Biofilm Solutions, and Manager of the Prince Philip Scholarship fund. He serves on the Fellowship and Advisory Boards of the British Heart Foundation His research is directed at the control of cellular activation. He thus has worked on the initiation of muscle contraction, its implications for cellular electrolyte homeostasis,  the control of bone resorption under both normal and osteoporotic conditions and cortical spreading depression phenomena in the central nervous system often presaging migraine headache . His current interests are directed towards mechanisms of arrhythmogenesis in genetically modified hearts, studied using biophysical, physiological and molecular biological methods and their implications for the management of atrial fibrillation  and sudden cardiac death.

References

Fellows of the Royal Society of Biology
Fellows of Murray Edwards College, Cambridge
Year of birth missing (living people)
Living people
Place of birth missing (living people)